The Legend of Faust (Italian: La leggenda di Faust) is a 1949 Italian drama film directed by Carmine Gallone and starring Italo Tajo, Nelly Corradi and Gino Mattera.

Cast
 Italo Tajo as Mephistofele
 Nelly Corradi as Margherita
 Gino Mattera as Faust
 Onelia Fineschi as Marguerite - Singing (singing voice)
 Livia Venturini 
 Cesare Barbetti as Siebel
 Gilles Quéant as Valentino 
 Thérèse Dorny as Marta
 Guido Leoncini 
 Gualtiero Tumiati 
 Claudio Ermelli

References

Bibliography
 Goble, Alan. The Complete Index to Literary Sources in Film. Walter de Gruyter, 1999.

External links

1949 films
1949 drama films
Italian drama films
1940s Italian-language films
Films directed by Carmine Gallone
Films based on Goethe's Faust
Films based on operas
Italian black-and-white films
Opera films
1940s Italian films